Loimologia, or, an historical Account of the Plague in London in 1665, With precautionary Directions against the like Contagion is a treatise by Dr. Nathaniel Hodges (1629–1688), originally published in London in Latin (Loimologia, sive, Pestis nuperæ apud populum Londinensem grassantis narratio historica) in 1672; an English translation was later published in London in 1720. The treatise provides a first-hand account of the Great Plague of London; it has been described as the best medical record of the epidemic. While most physicians fled the city, including the renowned Thomas Sydenham, and Sir Edward Alston, president of the Royal College of Physicians, Hodges was one of the few physicians who remained in the city during 1665, to record observations and test the effectiveness of treatments against the plague. The book also contains statistics on the victims in each parish.

The English translation (1720) was released while a plague was spreading throughout Marseilles, and people in England were fearful of another outbreak. To this 1720 edition was added An essay on the different causes of pestilential diseases, and how they become contagious; with remarks on the infection now in France, and the most probable means to prevent its spreading here, by John Quincy.

Loimologia was one of the sources used by Daniel Defoe when writing A Journal of the Plague Year (1722).

Excerpts

Further reading

  Text at Internet Archive

References

1672 books
1720 books
17th-century history books
18th-century history books
History books about London
History books about medicine
History books about the 17th century
Science books
Medical literature
English non-fiction literature
17th century in London
Health in London
17th-century Latin books
Second plague pandemic